NRS may refer to:

Name Registration Scheme, naming scheme by JANET used on British academic and research networks in the 1980
National Readership Survey, a joint venture company in the UK providing audience research for print advertising
NRS social grade, a system of demographic classification and a standard for market research
National Records of Scotland, the Scottish government department  responsible for civil registration, the census in Scotland, demography and statistics, family history and the national archives and historical records.
National Relay Service, an Australian government initiative for people who are deaf or have a hearing or speech impairment
National Reporter System, a set of case law reporters in the United States
National Retail Systems Inc., a global logistics and trucking company
National Runaway Switchboard, a national US hotline for youth in crisis
NetherRealm Studios, an American video game developer known for the Mortal Kombat series
Nevada Revised Statutes, Nevada laws
New Regeneration System, a process used for sugar thin-juice decalcification in beet sugar factories
Non-rocket spacelaunch, concepts for spacelaunch speed and altitude are provided by something other than rockets
Norman-Roberts syndrome, a brain disorder
Norwegian Air UK, airline with ICAO designator NRS
Numerical Rating Scale, a scale for pain
 Nil Ratan Sircar Medical College and Hospital, a renowned public medical school and hospital in Kolkata, India